Indus Dolphin Reserve is a Ramsar site located between Guddu Barrage and Sukkur Barrage on River Indus in Pakistan. Stretched on an area of 125,000 hectares, it was designated as a wetland protected site on 10 May 2001. In 1974 it was declared a protected site locally on the recommendation of World Wide Fund for Nature. According to a survey conducted in 1989, there are about 429 Indus river dolphin present.

References 

Ramsar sites in Pakistan
Protected areas of Pakistan